Nathalie Viérin (born 15 October 1982) is a retired Italian professional tennis player.

Her career high WTA singles ranking is No. 103, which she reached on May 15, 2006. Her career high doubles ranking is No. 304, set 24 September 2007. She has won 6 singles ITF titles. Nathalie Viérin retired from professional tennis 2010.

She is coached by Franco Bonaiti.

Personal life
Born and raised in Sarre, Aosta Valley, her parents, Angela Sirianni and Robert Viérin, run a tennis club, where she began playing when she was 3. Viérin has two younger brothers, Matthieu and Julien. Baseliner who prefers clay; favorite shot is forehand. Nickname is Natha. Admires Monica Seles. Likes to visit the beach in Bol, Croatia. Favorite movie is Dirty Dancing; favorite actor is Julia Roberts; favorite book is Palomino by Danielle Steel. Says Wimbledon is the best tournament.

ITF finals

Singles (6-10)

Doubles (0–3)

References

External links

1982 births
Living people
People from Aosta
Italian female tennis players
Mediterranean Games bronze medalists for Italy
Mediterranean Games medalists in tennis
Competitors at the 2001 Mediterranean Games
Sportspeople from Aosta Valley
21st-century Italian women